Jim Sweeney may refer to:

Sports
Jim Sweeney (American football, born 1929) (1929–2013), American college football coach
Jim Sweeney (American football, born 1962) (1962–2022), American professional football player and assistant coach
Jim Sweeney (basketball), American basketball player

Others
Jim Sweeney (actor) (born 1956), Scottish actor
Jim Sweeney (comedian) (born 1955), English actor and comedian

See also
Jimmy Sweeney (1922–1992), American singer
Jimmy Sweeney, Irish musician, based in Canada, and member of Barley Bree
James Sweeney (disambiguation)